Naval Medical Forces Atlantic was established August 2005 as Navy Medicine East and is a flag level command reporting directly to the Bureau of Medicine and Surgery. Naval Medical Forces Atlantic is responsible for administrative command over its subordinate commands, and for the provision of health and dental care within its area of responsibility. As of 2017, Navy Medicine East oversees over 100 medical facilities and a staff in excess of 26,000 in the eastern United States as well as overseas. 

Despite being located in Maryland, the Naval Medical Research Center has been under the command of Navy Medicine West, not Navy Medicine East, since August 2015.

In February 2019, the Surgeon General of the United States Navy announced plans to rename the command to "Medical Forces Atlantic."

Subordinate Commands

Commanding Officers

See also
Naval Medical Forces Pacific – Equivalent command for the western United States

References

Medical units and formations of the United States Navy